In the Australian Football League (AFL), previously the Victorian Football League (VFL), the pre-season competition, known during its history by a variety of sponsored names and most recently as the NAB Cup, was an annual Australian rules football tournament held amongst clubs prior to the premiership season between 1988 and 2013. The pre-season competition culminated annually in a grand final and pre-season premier.

After the 2013 season, the pre-season competition has consisted of a series of matches without an eventual winner. This series is currently known by the sponsored name AAMI Community Series.

History
The pre-season competition was established from the Australian Football Championships Night Series in 1988. The Night Series had been a competition featuring VFL, SANFL, WAFL and minor states representative teams which had been staged partly in the pre-season and partly during the premiership season, generally finishing in July; but, it had reduced in size and importance until 1987, when only VFL teams were involved and the competition was finished by the end of April. In 1988, the competition was moved entirely into the pre-season, and became the VFL Pre-season Cup. The pre-season competition is generally considered to be of equivalent importance as both the AFC Night Series and the VFL Night Series (1956–1971), and records relating to the three competitions are often combined.

Between 1988 and 1999, the competition was run as a simple knock-out tournament in which the winning teams moved through to the next round and losing teams were eliminated. Before there were sixteen teams in the AFL, the previous season's top-ranked teams (either the premier or both grand finalists) were advanced directly to the second round; after Fremantle entered the league as the 16th team in 1995, all teams began in the first round. In 1992, the competition introduced the Michael Tuck Medal for the best player in the grand final.

After criticism that the knock-out format limited the preparation of the losing teams, a round-robin format was introduced in 2000. The sixteen teams were split into groups of four, each playing three pool matches with the winner of each group advancing to the knockout semi-final stage. The public reaction to the change was mixed, as the atmosphere at some of the pool games was noticeably flat compared with previous years. The competition reverted to the straight knock-out format in 2003, and retained that format until 2010.

In 2011, the pre-season competition expanded to eighteen teams with the addition of the Gold Coast Suns (which joined the day premiership in 2011) and the Greater Western Sydney Giants (which joined the day premiership in 2012). Over the following three years, the first round of the pre-season competition was staged with six pools of three teams, with each group playing a round-robin of half-length lightning matches on the same day at the same venue. The format from that point was:
In 2011, the winner of each of the six groups, and the two teams with the next-best records, advanced to an eight-team knock-out tournament of full-length games.
In 2012 and 2013, all teams then played two pre-scheduled full-length games, giving each team a total of four matches (two lightning matches and two full-length matches). The teams with the best two records over the four matches then faced off in the Grand Final.

Since 2014, the competitive aspect of the preseason was abandoned altogether, and replaced with a series of discrete practice matches spanning a three-to-four-week period prior to the home-and-away season. This format features no ranking or overall winner. Since 2021, the series has been known as the AAMI Community Series.

Winners

Source:

Most Pre-Season Cup Competition Premierships 1988–2013 (26 Seasons)

Rules
Most games during the pre-season competition, including the final, were night matches. Normal games were typically played slightly short of full-length (quarters lasting 17½ or 18 minutes plus time-on instead of the normal 20), and with an extended interchange bench of six or eight players to offer less physically demanding conditions for the pre-season games. Lightning matches, when they were played from 2011 until 2013, were played over two-halves of 20 minutes plus time-on. Extra time was played to resolve drawn knock-out games.

From 2003 to 2017, pre-season matches featured the super goal as a scoring option. The super goal, which scores nine points, is awarded for a goal kicked from beyond the 50-metre arc.

Particularly in the 21st century, the pre-season competition was used to trial rule changes before they are introduced into the premiership season. Among the notable rule trials were:

2003
 Three points for a deliberate rushed behind.

2005
 After a behind is scored, no requirement to wait for the goal umpires to finish waving their flags before kicking out. (Has been introduced into the premiership season)
 A larger centre circle.
 Four field umpires
 Umpires coming in 10m from the boundary line to throw in the ball.
 Play on if the ball hits the goal post and bounces back into the field of play.

2006
 Play on called for backward kicks, except when that kick takes place within the attacking team's forward 50m.

2007
 Video replay umpire for goals.  Ability for goal umpire decisions to be overruled by video umpire.
 All nine umpires able to pay free kicks (includes boundary and goal umpires) (Trialled only in Melbourne vs Hawthorn Round 1 NAB Cup 2007)
 Play on called for backward kicks, only in the defensive half of the field.
 Kick must travel 20m to be paid a mark.

2008
 Eight players on the interchange bench, only 16 interchanges permitted each quarter.
 2.5m x 6.5m "no-go" area around the centre bounce, where players are prohibited before and during the bounce until the umpire clears the area.
 Centre bounces only at the start of a quarter and after goals, ball is thrown up otherwise. (Has been introduced into the premiership season)

2009
 If the ball is hand-passed or kicked for a rushed behind the opposition receives a free kick (Introduced into the premiership season in 2009 AFL season)

2010
 Players can determine if there is an advantage in play (has been introduced into the premiership season)

Notable events
1990
Essendon vs Fitzroy (Feb.28) was the first VFL/AFL match to be decided using extra-time – the Bombers getting home by a goal in overtime then winning their next two matches to claim the title.

1993

Problems with new turf at Waverley Park forced the relocation of three matches – Melbourne v Collingwood (Feb.17) was moved to Princes Park, whilst Essendon v Brisbane (Feb.27) and Footscray v Fitzroy (Feb.28) were moved to Kardinia Park.

A record night series/pre-season Grand Final crowd of 75,533 fans saw Essendon defeat Richmond.

1997

The Grand Final was held at the MCG to capitalise on Grand Prix weekend in Melbourne, the first time it had been played away from Waverley Park. A near-record crowd of 74,786 watched Carlton defeat Geelong.

1998
Pre-season football was played outside Australia for the first time, with Brisbane defeating Fremantle in Cape Town, South Africa (Feb.22) followed by Melbourne defeating Sydney in Wellington, New Zealand (Mar.1).

2000
Carlton and Collingwood played the earliest pre-season match in history, with a one-off match called the "Millennium Challenge" played on the evening of 31 December 1999 at the MCG and counting towards the preseason competition. The game was sparsely attended.

2001
The final was played for the first time between two non-Victorian teams, and consequently the match was played outside Victoria, at Football Park in Adelaide.

2006
A new rule was introduced to determine the venue of the pre-season Grand Final. The team scoring the most goals in the first three rounds would host the title match. If two teams were tied after the semi-finals the number of super goals kicked would act as a tie-breaker.

Naming rights sponsors 

 Panasonic Cup (1988–89)
 Foster's Cup (1990–94)
 Ansett Australia Cup (1995–2001)
 Wizard Home Loans Cup (2002–2005)
 NAB Cup (2006–2013)
 NAB Challenge (2014–2016)
 JLT Community Series (2017–2019)
 Marsh Community Series (2020)
 AAMI Community Series (2021–present)

Trophy

The design of the trophy for the pre-season competition has varied greatly over the years.

When it was the Wizard Home Loans Cup it was affectionately known by fans as the "Wizard Wok" due to the shape of it being like a wok.

More recently it has taken the more traditional trophy shape.

Monetary prize
The prize money awarded to the winning club was A$180,000 as of the 2012 NAB Cup, awarded by the National Australia Bank as major sponsor of the competition.

As an incentive for clubs to produce competitive performances in the pre-season competition, a bonus A$1 million in prize money was on offer to any club which could win both the pre-season cup and premiership during the 2007 AFL season. This prize would have been separate from the A$220,000 and A$1.4 million prizes for the NAB Cup and premiership victors, respectively, and was pledged by the league's two major sponsors, Toyota and National Australia Bank. The distribution of the prize would have resulted in half being awarded to the winning club and half being divided among the club's players. Ultimately, however, this offer did not eventuate, as two separate clubs, Carlton and Geelong, won the 2007 NAB Cup and 2007 premiership, respectively, and the incentive was discontinued in future seasons.

Attendances 
Although many clubs and coaches (especially the wealthier clubs) do not take the pre-season competition seriously and use the competition as a chance to test young and inexperienced players, the preseason competition proved reasonably popular with spectators. The competition's Grand Final could draw more than 60,000 spectators to the Melbourne Cricket Ground, and usually drew more than 40,000 to Docklands Stadium or Football Park (both of which have a capacity of around 55,000)

Other pre-season competitions

Lightning premiership

A lightning premiership was held for the only time in the modern era in 1996 – the centenary season of the AFL. It was a knock-out competition played from Friday, 9 February until Sunday, 11 February, with four shortened games each evening at Waverley Park, each consisting of two 17.5-minute halves.

The game trialled a number of highly experimental rules, including three points awarded both for deliberate rushed behinds and balls which hit the goalposts, and timekeepers not blowing the siren if scores were tied. However, the rule which altered play most significantly was the ball not being thrown in from the boundary line after travelling out of bounds, a free kick being awarded instead against the last team to touch the ball. Essendon won the title, defeating Brisbane by 17 points in the grand final.

Regional challenge
Since 2003, the AFL has run a series of pre-season practice matches called the "Regional Challenge" or "NAB Challenge" for clubs that are eliminated from the main pre-season cup competition. It provides eliminated teams with match practice before the main premiership season and brings the game to fans in remote areas and can gauge interest in new markets.

Venues are limited to those that are considered AFL standard. This requires surfaces that prevent injury to players, spectator facilities including grandstand seating, and adequate lights for night matches.  Many of the matches in this series are still played at current AFL and former AFL metropolitan venues, particularly since 2007 when the Victorian drought made many regional grounds in Victoria either unavailable or unsuitable for AFL matches. Although the games were exhibitional in nature and there was no prize, they attracted a large amount of interest in regional areas and have grown in popularity.

While attendances for these matches are sometimes published in the media and the AFL carries match reports on all matches, the AFL does not always publish attendance for these matches as the attendances are quite low by AFL standards.  In 2005, the total Regional Challenge attendance was 117,552, up from 87,000 in 2004 and 76,000 in 2003.

See also
 List of Australian Football League pre-season and night series premiers
 Michael Tuck Medal, awarded to the best player in a night series grand final

References